Terry  M. McGovern is the Harriet and Robert H. Heilbrunn Professor and Chair of the Heilbrunn Department of Population and Family Health at Columbia University's Mailman School of Public Health. Since 2018, she has served as director of the Department's Program on Global Health Justice and Governance. Before joining the Mailman School, in 1989 McGovern founded the HIV Law Project and served as the Executive Director until 1999. While at the HIV Law Project, Terry McGovern litigated the groundbreaking case, S.P. v. Sullivan, which led to the Social Security Administration including HIV-related disability in their criteria. She was appointed by President Bill Clinton to the National Task Force on AIDS Drug Development.

Early life
McGovern was born in the Bronx, New York.

Education 
McGovern graduated Summa Cum Laude from the State University of New York in Albany New York, in 1983. She received a J.D. from Georgetown University Law Center in 1986.

Career 
McGovern is known for her leadership as a health and human rights scholar addressing a number of issues including LGBT equality, environmental justice, sexual and reproductive health, and overall health outcomes for low-income women. Her legal work tackling health inequalities for low-income people living with HIV/AIDS in New York City, specifically women of color with HIV has led to numerous testimonials before Congress and other policy-makers. Her research focuses on health and human rights, sexual and reproductive rights and health, gender justice, and environmental justice, with publications appearing in journals including Lancet Child & Adolescent Health, Health and Human Rights, and the Journal of Adolescent Health. She has authored various publications and research articles challenging discriminatory norms.

In 2017, she published an article with colleagues Johanna Fine, a human rights lawyer formerly with the Center for Reproductive Rights, Carolyn Crisp, and Emily Battistini, both Alumni from Columbia University's Mailman School of Public Health. The article demonstrated that Sustainable Development Goals have the potential to generate action and accountability to end the HIV epidemic among women and girls. In 2019, she published a study that examined the association between legal systems and health disparities in women and girls in Nigeria.

McGovern's mother, Ann McGovern, was killed in the September 11 attacks. McGovern founded a group called 9/11 Families for Human Rights and was an advocate for accountability and transparency from the US Government in the September 11 Commission.

In 2007, a play she created based on interviews with family members of September 11 victims called "9/11: Voices Unheard," which was produced in collaboration with the Irondale Ensemble Project at the Theater for the New City. She later organized other 9/11 families to protest the “Muslim Ban” and has spoken out extensively in the exploitation of the September 11 attacks to justify xenophobia and discrimination.

References 

Columbia University Mailman School of Public Health faculty
Georgetown University Law Center alumni
HIV/AIDS activists
Living people
Year of birth missing (living people)